Volker Mai (born 3 May 1966 in Templin) is a former triple jumper who represented East Germany. Representing SC Neubrandenburg, he holds the current world junior record with 17.50 metres, achieved on 23 June 1985 in Erfurt.

Biography
Mai won his first international medal at the 1985 European Athletics Indoor Championships, where he cleared 17.14 m to take the bronze medal. He then secured a triple jump and long jump double at the 1985 European Athletics Junior Championships held in Cottbus. That same year he ranked second in the triple jump at the 1985 European Cup.  The following year he managed seventh at the 1986 European Athletics Championships. Another indoor medal followed at the 1989 European Athletics Indoor Championships and he was the silver medallist behind Nikolay Musiyenko of the USSR. His final appearance for East Germany came at the 1990 European Athletics Championships and he finished fifth behind his compatriot Jörg Friess.

He made three major international appearances for Germany in his career: he was fifth at the 1991 IAAF World Indoor Championships, 13th in qualifying at the 1993 World Championships in Athletics and eighth in qualifying at the 1994 European Athletics Championships.

Nationally, he was a four-time East German Indoor triple jump champion (1984, 1985, 1987, 1989) and a two-time East German outdoor champion (1984, 1988). Following German reunification he was the German indoor champion in 1991, 1993 and 1995, and took his sole German outdoor title in 1994. In addition to his ten national titles in the triple jump, he was the 1989 East German champion in the long jump.

Mai was implicated in state-sponsored doping by Werner Franke and Brigitte Berendonk in their book Doping: From Research to Deceit. Based upon research of leaked Stasi files, Franke and Berendonk deduced that Mai had undergone cycles of Oral Turinabol (a banned steroid) in the period of 1982 to 1984.

After his track and field career ended he moved to the United States to study microbiology. He received his doctorate in the discipline at the University of Georgia. After gaining a master's degree from Harvard School of Public Health, he took up an assistant professorship at the University of Maryland Medical School. He has worked as an assistant microbiology professor at the University of Florida since 2007.

Achievements

References

External links

1966 births
Living people
People from Templin
People from Bezirk Neubrandenburg
East German male triple jumpers
Sportspeople from Brandenburg
University of Georgia alumni
Harvard School of Public Health alumni